Carlos Fernando Flores Labra (born January 9, 1943) is a Chilean engineer, entrepreneur and politician. He is a former cabinet minister of president Salvador Allende and was senator for the Arica and Parinacota and Tarapacá regions between 2001 and 2009. On March 31, 2010, he was designated President of Chile's National Innovation Council for Competitiveness by President Sebastián Piñera.

Biography
Flores was born in Talca, Chile. He became finance minister in the government of Chilean president Salvador Allende and then spent three years as a political prisoner (from September 11, 1973 to 1976) after the military coup of General Augusto Pinochet. Subsequently, forced into exile, after negotiations on his behalf by Amnesty International, he moved with his family to Palo Alto, California, and worked as a researcher in the Computer Science department at Stanford University.  He subsequently obtained his PhD at UC Berkeley under the guidance of Hubert Dreyfus, Stuart Dreyfus, John Searle and Ann Markussen. There he developed his work on philosophy, coaching and workflow technology, influenced by Martin Heidegger, Humberto Maturana, John Austin and others. His thesis was titled Management and Communication in the Office of the Future.

Projects and companies founded
Flores has founded several companies including "Hermenet" (in partnership with Werner Erhard); "Logonet", a design, logistics, and manufacturing company; "Business Design Associates", a management consulting company) and Action Technologies, a software company, where he introduced new distinctions in workflow analysis, groupware, software design and business process analysis that he developed in association with Terry Winograd. He has also founded an Internet-based movement called Atina Chile. His newest project is Pluralistic Networks, a company that plans to develop leadership and communication abilities in virtual business teams using multi-player online games, currently World of Warcraft.

Politics

Flores was Finance Minister of president Salvador Allende in the early 1970s and later the Secretary General of the Government and, during the Coup, he was alongside the President in La Moneda Palace. After the coup d'état he was imprisoned, subjected to prolonged, systematic psychological torture and later driven to exile by the military regime of Augusto Pinochet.

In 2001 Flores was elected senator for the Tarapacá Region, as a member of the center-left Party for Democracy (PPD), a constituent party of the governing coalition Concertación.

In late 2004 Flores was unsuccessful in becoming the PPD's candidate for President of Chile and he later supported the candidacy of Michelle Bachelet.

In 2006 Flores ran for the presidency of the PPD party, but lost to Sergio Bitar. Later that year, with the possibility of being a presidential candidate slipping away, he began to move away from his center-left party. On January 8, 2007, he inaugurated a new political project called ChileFirst. The next day he submitted his resignation to the PPD. He is currently an independent Senator who caucuses with the center-right Alliance for Chile (a coalition of 2 right wing parties). He drew sharp criticism from his former political allies for supporting Sebastián Piñera's presidential candidacy. He did not seek re-election in December 2009 and ChileFirst won no seats in Congress in the election. Until March 2010 he remained as an independent senator. On March 31, 2010 he was designated President of Chile's National Innovation Council for Competitiveness by President Piñera.

Influence on modern coaching industry 
Flores exerted a significant influence on the development of the modern coaching industry by collaborating with or influencing several individuals who would become prominent leaders in the coach training industry. In the mid-1970's Flores was hired by Werner Erhard to offer workshops for his office staff.  Shortly after, Flores began offering a workshop through Erhard Seminar's Training (est) called Conversations for Action. This workshop was based off his synthesis of the Theory of Speech Acts by J.L. Austin and the Theory of Commitments by John Searle. The collaboration between Flores and est was influential for many people, who would later found prominent coaching schools including Thomas J. Leonard  and Laura Whitworth, accounting department employees at Werner Erhard and Associates who also attended est. workshops.  They would later found Coach U (Leonard) and Coach Training Institute (Whitworth). James Flaherty  was an est guest and graduate trainer who would go on to collaborate with Flores before founding New Ventures West and the methodology of Integral Coaching. Flores was also influential in the development of ontological coaching, teaching and collaborating with Julio Ollala and Rafael Echeverria who would later go on to co-found Newfield Network.

In her study of the emergence of professional coaching, Dr. Vikki Brock identifies the collaboration between Werner Erhard and Fernando Flores as a convergence point that gave rise to a specific and distinct coaching lineage.

Publications
 Building Trust: In Business, Politics, Relationships, and Life, (author)
 Understanding Computers and Cognition : A New Foundation for Design (with Terry Winograd), (co-author)
 Disclosing New Worlds: Entrepreneurship, Democratic Action, and the Cultivation of Solidarity, (co-author, with Charles Spinosa and Hubert Dreyfus)
Conversations For Action and Collected Essays: Instilling a Culture of Commitment in Working Relationships 
 Beyond Calculation: The Next Fifty Years, a special issue of the Communications of the ACM journal, (contributor)

See also
Language/action perspective
Project Cybersyn

References

External links
Fast Company article on Flores — "The Power of Words"
Center for Quality of Management Journal article — "Using the Methods of Fernando Flores"
Stanford University article on Flores 

1943 births
Living people
Chilean Ministers of Economy
Members of the Senate of Chile
Communication theorists
Members of the MAPU Obrero Campesino
Party for Democracy (Chile) politicians
People from Talca
Candidates for President of Chile
Chilean exiles